Oliver Henry Freckingham (born 12 November 1988) is an English first-class cricketer. He was born at Oakham and played for Leicestershire County Cricket Club as a right arm fast-medium bowler and right-handed batsman.

Freckingham first played for Leicestershire's Second XI in 2010. He has played league cricket for Loughborough Town.

Freckingham signed a one-year contract with Leicestershire in September 2012  to play in the 2013 County Championship season. He made his debut in the season opener against Hampshire at The Rose Bowl taking 3/100 in his first innings. He became a regular in Leicestershire's County Championship side and in his fifth game took 6/125, and had match figures of 9/188 against Northamptonshire.

After being Leicestershir'e leading wicket-taker during the 2013 season, Freckingham signed a new two-year deal in October 2013.

Personal life 
Freckingham plays golf to a good standard and before he joined Leicestershire full-time, worked as a shop manager at Rutland County Golf Club.

References

External links 
 
 Leicestershire County Cricket Club Profile

1988 births
Living people
Cheshire cricketers
Cricketers from Rutland
English cricketers
Leicestershire cricketers
People from Oakham